The Roman Catholic Diocese of Arica is a diocese located in the city of Arica in the Ecclesiastical province of Antofagasta in Chile.

History
 17 February 1959: Established as Territorial Prelature of Arica from the Diocese of Iquique
 29 August 1986: Promoted as Diocese of Arica

Leadership, in reverse chronological order
 Bishops of Arica (Roman rite)
 Bishop Moises Carlos Atisha Contreras, Sch.P. (2014.11.21 – present)
 Bishop Héctor Vargas Bastidas, S.D.B. (2003.11.25 – 2013.05.14), appointed Bishop of Temuco
 Bishop Renato Hasche Sánchez, S.J. (1993.05.15 – 2003.04.24)
 Bishop Ramón Salas Valdés, S.J. (1986.08.29 – 1993.05.15)
 Prelates of Arica (Roman rite) 
 Bishop Ramón Salas Valdés, S.J. (1963.10.08 – 1986.08.29)

Sources
 GCatholic.org
 Catholic Hierarchy
  Diocese website

Roman Catholic dioceses in Chile
Christian organizations established in 1959
Roman Catholic dioceses and prelatures established in the 20th century
Arica, Roman Catholic Diocese of
1959 establishments in Chile